The Heritage and Culture Education Center of Taipei City is located in the historic Bopiliao area in Wanhua District, Taipei, Taiwan.

Architecture
Most of the buildings in the area are historic buildings which feature architectural style from the Qing Dynasty period, with arched bricks arcades and curved pattern window lattices.

Transportation
The center is accessible within walking distance north east of Longshan Temple Station of Taipei Metro.

See also
 List of tourist attractions in Taiwan

References

External links
 Visitors Information

Buildings and structures in Taipei